Preecha Nopparat (born 21 September 1948) is a Thai boxer. He competed in the men's featherweight event at the 1972 Summer Olympics. At the 1972 Summer Olympics, he lost to Andras Botos of Hungary in the Round of 64.

References

1948 births
Living people
Preecha Nopparat
Preecha Nopparat
Boxers at the 1972 Summer Olympics
Place of birth missing (living people)
Featherweight boxers